Danai Kaldaridou (born 3 September 1997) is a Greek footballer who plays as a midfielder for Liga BPI club Damaiense and the Greece national team.

International career
Kaldaridou made her debut for the Greece national team on 12 November 2019, coming on as a substitute for Eleni Kakambouki against the Republic of Ireland.

Personal life
Of partial English descent, Kaldaridou grew up in Athens and moved to England at the age of 16.

Honours
Birmingham City
 FA WSL Development League Cup: 2015

Individual
 All-OVC Newcomer team: 2016
 All-OVC first team: 2017, 2018
 OVC Commissioner's Honor Roll: 2016, 2017, 2018
 OVC Medal of Honour: 2018
 NCAA Division I Women's All-South Region Third Team: 2018

References

1997 births
Living people
Women's association football midfielders
Greek women's footballers
Greece women's international footballers
Clube de Albergaria players
Footballers from Athens
Greek footballers
Greek people of English descent
Greek expatriate women's footballers
Expatriate women's footballers in Portugal
Greek expatriate sportspeople in Portugal
Expatriate women's soccer players in the United States
Greek expatriate sportspeople in the United States